Ben Hur trailer was the nickname of the World War II U.S. Army Trailer, 1-ton payload, 2-wheel, cargo, and the Trailer, 1-ton payload, 2-wheel, water tank, 250 gallon ( U.S. Army Ordnance Corps Supply catalogue designations G-518 and G-527 respectively). Specialized variants were also manufactured.

The one-ton trailers were designed to be towed by vehicles rated -ton and upwards, like the Dodge WC series trucks, as well as -ton 4x4 trucks, and -ton 6x6 trucks, such as the Chevrolet G506 and the much used GMC CCKW trucks.

The G-518 trailers were among the Allies' most built and used models with a total of 259,064 units made.

Description

The Ben Hur trailer was nicknamed after its major manufacturer, the Ben–Hur Mfg. Co., although there were many other companies that produced it between 1941 and 1945. Its primary purpose was to transport general cargo; the Signal Corps modified it to carry several different generators.

Variants
K-52 equipped with a PE-95 generator
K-63 equipped with a PE-99 generator
K-63A equipped with a PE-197 generator
V-15 used for the AN/TPQ-2 radar
M24 ammunition trailer (used with M15 multiple gun motor carriage, auto 37mm & two .50 BMG)
M25 A-load carried a 25KW generator for the tire repair truck
M25 B-load carried spares and fuel for the tire repair truck
G527 water carrier, nicknamed "water buffalo"

Specifications

Weight (empty): 
Cargo volume: 
Length: 
Width: 
Height:  with canvas top
Axles: 1, with 2 wheels
Brakes: hand, parking only

Production
G-518 trailers were manufactured by over two dozen companies:

American Bantam
Ben Hur Mfg. Co., Milwaukee, Wisconsin
Century Boat Works
Checker Motors Corporation
Covered Wagon Co., Michigan 
Dorsey Trailer
Gerstenslager
Henney Motor Company
Hercules Body,
Highland Body & Trailer Mfg. Co, Cincinnati 
Hobbs Trailer & Equipment Inc, (then) Texas 
Hyde,
Keystone RV,
Mifflinburg Body Company, (were in) Pennsylvania
Naburs,
Nash-Kelvinator,
Omaha Standard Body,
Pke,
Queen City,
Redman's Trailers, Connecticut,
Steel Products,
Streich,
Strick Trailers, Indiana,
Transportation Equipment Corp, Missouri
Truck Engineering Corporation, Indiana
Willys Overland,
Winter Weiss Defense Trailers, Denver, Colorado

See also
List of U.S. Signal Corps Vehicles

Notes

References

General references
TM 9-883 1-Ton, 2-Wheel, Cargo and Water Trailers, 1943
TM 10-1395
TM 9-2800 Standard Military Motor Vehicles. dated 1 sept. 1943
TM 9-2800 Military vehicles dated Oct. 1947
TM 11-227 Signal Communication Directory. dated 10 April 1944
TM 11-487 Electrical Communication systems Equipment. dated 2 Oct. 1944

External links
GMC CCKW website, G-518 trailer page 
LIFE: Side view of cargo trailer for general u... - Hosted by Google
LIFE: Front view of cargo trailer for general ... - Hosted by Google

Military trailers of the United States
Military vehicles introduced from 1940 to 1944